Happy Journey is a 1943 Czechoslovak drama film directed by Otakar Vávra. The film featured four leading actresses of 1940s Czech cinema – Adina Mandlová, Jiřina Štěpničková, Hana Vítová and Nataša Gollová.

Cast
 Adina Mandlová as Shop assistant  Helena Truxová
 Jiřina Štěpničková as Shop assistant Anna Waltrová-Ortová
 Hana Vítová as Shop assistant Milena
 Nataša Gollová as Shop assistant Fanynka
 Jana Dítětová as Boženka
 Otomar Korbelář as Industrialist Jan Klement
 Eduard Kohout as Viktor Zych, Helena's boyfriend
 Vítězslav Vejražka as Waiter Martin, Milena's fiancé
 Karel Hradilák as Fred Valenta
 František Kreuzmann as Cheater Pepa Hodek
 Nelly Gaierová as Hodek's lover
 Jaroslav Marvan as Mall director
 Míla Pačová as Store director Vacková

References

External links
 

1943 films
1943 drama films
1940s Czech-language films
Czechoslovak black-and-white films
Films directed by Otakar Vávra
Czechoslovak drama films
1940s Czech films